Benedict from the kindred Pápa (died after 1244) was a Hungarian noble, who served as Vice-Judge royal in 1244, under Demetrius Csák.

He belonged to the kindred Pápa as the son of Syka (or Sike). He had a brother Lampert.

References

Sources

 

13th-century Hungarian people
Benedict